Ulf Lundin (born in Alingsås, 1965) is a Swedish artist who lives and works in Stockholm.

Ulf Lundin studied at the School of Photography at Gothenburg University. He has had many solo exhibitions internationally including shows at Magnus Karlsson Gallery (2008), Thessalonica Center, Greece (2000) and at the Photographers' Gallery, London (1998).
His video works have been shown widely including screenings at Lebanese American University, Lebanon (2005), 291, London (2003), Museum of Modern Art, Ljubljana, Slovenia (1999).

Participated in the exhibition Cut my legs off and call me shorty! at Tensta Konsthall summer 2009.

External links 
Art News 2009
Exhibition Gävle
Assimilating Consciousness, Strategies in Photographic Practice (2003)
Review in Dagens Nyheter (Swedish)

1965 births
Living people
Swedish photographers
University of Gothenburg alumni